In the Wings: A Memoir is a 1999 book written by American actress Diana Douglas. In the book, she accused her first husband, film star Kirk Douglas, of being a drug addict. She revealed in the book, as well, that she had an affair with Errol Flynn. Kirk Douglas called her a "Blabbermouth" after the book came out.

References

1999 non-fiction books
American memoirs
English-language books